Rubidium bromide is the bromide of rubidium. It has a NaCl crystal structure, with a lattice constant of 685 picometres.

There are several methods for synthesising rubidium bromide. One involves reacting rubidium hydroxide with hydrobromic acid:

RbOH + HBr → RbBr + H2O

Another method is to neutralize rubidium carbonate with hydrobromic acid:

Rb2CO3 + 2 HBr → 2 RbBr + H2O + CO2

Rubidium metal would react directly with bromine to form RbBr, but this is not a sensible production method, since rubidium metal is substantially more expensive than the carbonate or hydroxide; moreover, the reaction would be explosive.

References

 WebElements. URL accessed March 1, 2006.

Rubidium compounds
Bromides
Metal halides
Alkali metal bromides
Rock salt crystal structure